Collieston is a small former fishing village on the North Sea coast in Aberdeenshire, Scotland. The village lies just north of the Sands of Forvie Special Protection Area, between Cruden Bay and Newburgh.

History
The earliest recorded history of Collieston is of the arrival of St Ternan, a Columban monk on a mission to convert the local picts to Christianity. There is, however, evidence that people lived here during much earlier times.

Collieston was established as a fishing village by the 16th century, and it provides the first safe harbour in over fifteen miles of beaches and dunes stretching north from Aberdeen. Fishing for herring, haddock, whiting and cod flourished in the 17th century and 18th century and was the foundation of Collieston's economy. The village became known for 'Collieston Speldings', salted and sun-dried haddock and whiting, a popular delicacy throughout Britain. As drift netting developed during the mid 19th century, the fishing began to decline and the focus of the industry shifted to places like Peterhead because the harbour at Collieston was too small to safely accommodate the larger boats needed.

The numerous sea caves in the nearby cliffs, and small coves with shingle beaches provided ideal terrain for smugglers. In the late 18th century it was estimated by the Excise that up to 8000 gallons of foreign spirits were being illegally landed in the area every month. In 1798, the notorious village smuggler, Phillip Kennedy, was killed by a blow from an exciseman's cutlass. His grave and tombstone still stands in the village graveyard.

A ship from the Spanish Armada, the Santa Caterina, carrying arms for the Earl of Erroll is said to have sunk just off the rocky point of St Catherine's Dub in 1594. In retaliation for the Earl's involvement in the Catholic plot against him, James VI blew up the Earl's castle which stood on the cliffs, a mile north of Collieston. The Earl went on to rebuild Slains Castle, six miles further up the coast, in 1597.

Collieston is now mainly a commuter village serving Aberdeen, and is largely given over to tourists during the summer months.

Trivia
In September 1930, T. E. Lawrence, better known as Lawrence of Arabia, rented a cottage in the village while on leave from the RAF. He referred to the cottage in his writings as "the nearest hovel to the high-tide mark". This cottage still exists, although it has since been modernised and extensively rebuilt.

References
 AA Touring Guide to Scotland (1978)

External links

 Collieston Online
 Collieston's Century, an interactive history

Seaside resorts in Scotland
Villages in Aberdeenshire